Charolles (Burgundian: Tsarolles) is a commune in the Saône-et-Loire department in the region of Bourgogne-Franche-Comté in eastern France. Since 2004 is Charolles part of the Charolais-Brionnais Country.

Geography

History
Charolles was the capital of Charolais, an old division of France, which from the early 14th century gave the title of count to its possessors. In 1327 the county passed by marriage to the house of Armagnac, and in 1390 it was sold to Philip of Burgundy. After the death of Charles the Bold, who in his youth had borne the title of count of Charolais, it was seized by Louis XI of France, but in 1493 it was ceded by Charles VIII to Maximilian of Austria, the representative of the Burgundian family. Ultimately passing to the Spanish kings, it became for a considerable period an object of dispute between France and Spain, until at length in 1684 it was assigned to the great Condé, a creditor of the king of Spain. It was united to the French crown in 1771.

Sights
The ruins of the castle of the counts of Charolais occupy the summit of a hill in the immediate vicinity of the town.

Economy

According to the Encyclopædia Britannica Eleventh Edition, in the early 20th century there were stone quarries in the vicinity; the town manufactured pottery, and was the centre for trade in the famous breed of Charolais cattle and in agricultural products.

Tourism

In the Southern Bourgogne-Franche-Comté area, you can see :
 The Arboretum de Pézanin, one of the richest forest collection in France, near Charolles,
 The Rock of Solutré,
 The Cluny abbey and its medieval city,
 Mâcon, Paray-le-Monial, La Clayette...

People
Charolles was the birthplace of:
 Louis Jacolliot (1837–1890), author
 Albert Roux (born 1935) and Michel Roux (1941-2020), French-born Michelin-starred restaurateurs working in Britain

Climate
Climate in this area has mild differences between highs and lows, and there is adequate rainfall year-round.  The Köppen Climate Classification subtype for this climate is "Cfb". (Marine West Coast Climate/Oceanic climate).

See also
Communes of the Saône-et-Loire department

References

Communes of Saône-et-Loire
Subprefectures in France
Charolais, France